Parliamentary elections were held in Colombia on 16 March 1947 to elect the Senate and Chamber of Representatives, the first occasion on which the Senate was directly elected. The result was a victory for the Liberal Party, which won 73 of the 131 seats in the Chamber.

Results

Senate

Chamber of Representatives

References

Parliamentary elections in Colombia
Colombia
1947 in Colombia
Election and referendum articles with incomplete results
March 1947 events in South America